John Roberts (24 June 1895 – 9 December 1987) was an Irish hurler, handballer, referee and Gaelic games administrator. His league and championship career at senior level with the Kilkenny county team spanned thirteen years from 1916 until 1929.

Born in Kilkenny, Roberts was educated at St John's Boys' School. He first played competitive hurling at the age of fourteen with the Dean Street Volunteers before joining the Dicksboro club in 1914. After winning county junior championship medals in 1914 and 1919, Roberts went on the captain the club at senior level. He won county senior championship medals in 1923 and 1926.

Roberts first came to prominence on the inter-county scene in 1916. After impressing in a trial game he became a regular member of the Kilkenny senior team the following year. Over the course of the following thirteen championship seasons, Roberts won one All-Ireland medal.  He also won three Leinster medals and played his last game for Kilkenny in 1929.

As a member of the first Leinster inter-provincial team in 1927, Roberts won one Railway Cup medal in the inaugural year of the competition.

In retirement from playing, Roberts continued his involvement with the game as a referee and administrator. He refereed the 1928 All-Ireland final between Cork and Galway, as well as numerous county championship matches in Kilkenny and Wexford. Roberts was Kilkenny's representative on the Leinster Council from 1927 until 1942

Honours
Kilkenny
All-Ireland Senior Hurling Championship (1): 1922
Munster Senior Hurling Championship (3): 1922, 1923, 1926

References

1895 births
1987 deaths
All-Ireland Senior Hurling Championship Final referees
All-Ireland Senior Hurling Championship winners
Dicksboro hurlers
Gaelic games administrators
Hurling referees
Irish bakers
Kilkenny inter-county hurlers
Leinster inter-provincial hurlers